Atractiella is a genus of fungi in the Phleogenaceae family. The widespread genus contains six species.

References

External links

Basidiomycota genera
Atractiellales